The South Korean pop duo TVXQ, known as  in Japan, have embarked on eight Japanese concert tours. Tohoshinki debuted in Japan as a five-member pop group in April 2005, and held their first Japanese tour, the Heart, Mind, and Soul Tour, in 2006. This was followed by the Five in the Black Tour in 2007 and the T Tour in 2008, the latter tour bringing in an estimate of 150,000 fans from 17 shows. From May to July 2009, Tohoshinki held their fourth and last Japanese tour as a quintet, The Secret Code Tour, attracting 300,000 fans. For the tour's finale, Tohoshinki performed in the Tokyo Dome, making them the third Korean music act, and the first Korean pop group, to do so.

After the departure of members Jejung, Yuchun, and Junsu in 2010, remaining Tohoshinki members Yunho and Changmin did not tour again until January 2012, when they held their first concert tour as a duo, titled the Tone Tour. The tour mobilized 550,000 fans in Japan, which was the largest overseas concert held by a Korean artist at the time. The duo broke their own record the following year with their sixth Japanese concert tour, the Time Tour, which was the duo's first concert tour to visit all five of Japan's dome venues. The tour's two-day finale was in Japan's largest stadium, the Nissan Stadium, pushing the duo to be the first and only international music act to headline a concert in the stadium. The Time Tour was the highest-grossing and most-attended concert tour held by a foreign music act in Japan, mobilizing over 850,000 people and grossing US$93 million in ticket sales.

Tohoshinki held their seventh Japanese tour, the Tree Tour, in the summer of 2014, bringing in an audience of 600,000 people. The duo celebrated their tenth anniversary debut in Japan with the launch of their With Tour, the duo's second 5-Dome concert tour in Japan. It was attended by over 750,000 people. The With Tour was the duo's last headlining Japanese concert before taking their indefinite hiatus to enlist in South Korea's compulsory military service. Since the completion of their service, the duo have headlined two more Japanese tours: the record-breaking 2017 Begin Again Tour and the 2018 Tomorrow Tour.

Tohoshinki have set numerous attendance records with their concerts in Japan: they were the first Korean pop group to perform in the Tokyo Dome, the first Korean music act to helm a five-Dome tour, the first foreign music act to headline a concert in the Nissan Stadium, and the highest-grossing foreign music act in history. From January 2012 to June 2014, the duo performed in concerts for over 2 million people in Japan, the fastest mobilization by a non-Japanese act. The duo broke their own records in 2017 to hold the largest, highest-grossing, and most-attended concert tour in Japan by a foreign act with their Begin Again Tour, mobilizing over 1.28 million fans and grossing US$110 million in ticket sales, as well as becoming the first and only foreign act to play at the Nissan Stadium for three consecutive days.

Heart, Mind and Soul: 1st Live Tour 2006

Five in the Black: 2nd Live Tour 2007

T: 3rd Live Tour 2008

The Secret Code: 4th Live Tour 2009

2012–14: Tone, Time and Tree Live Tours

With: Live Tour 2015 
With: Live Tour 2015 (stylized as Tohoshinki Live Tour 2015 ～WITH～), also known as the With Tour, was the eighth Japanese concert tour (thirteenth overall) by South Korean pop duo Tohoshinki. It was launched in support of their eighth Japanese studio album With (2014), and in celebration of Tohoshinki's tenth anniversary in Japan. The With Tour was the duo's second five-dome tour in Japan, their last one being 2013's Time Tour.

The tour was first announced by the duo in August 2014 at the A-Nation Stadium Festival concert in Tokyo. It kicked off at the Fukuoka Dome on February 6, 2015, and concluded in the Tokyo Dome on April 2, 2015. The tour drew in over 750,000 people from 16 shows. The With Tour was the duo's last headlining Japanese concert before taking their two-year hiatus to enlist in South Korea's compulsory military service.

Overview

On August 30, 2014, during the A-Nation Stadium Festival concert, Tohoshinki announced that they would embark on their second Dome tour in early 2015 in support for their tenth anniversary debut in Japan. Following the duo's unveil, twelve dates for their tour were announced by their record label Avex Trax. On October 23, Avex announced the tour's supporting album With. Due to high demand, two additional dates were announced for the Fukuoka Dome and Kyocera Dome Osaka on November 1. On December 10, the official tour logo was revealed along with the announcement that two more dates were added in April for the Tokyo Dome, extending the With Tour to sixteen shows. The tour's official website and merchandise were launched on January 8, 2015.

Begin Again: Live Tour 2017 
Begin Again: Live Tour 2017 (stylized as Tohoshinki Live Tour 2017 ～Begin Again～), also known as the Begin Again Tour, was the ninth Japanese concert tour and fifth dome tour by South Korean pop duo Tohoshinki. It was launched in support of their Japanese compilation album Fine Collection ～Begin Again～ (2017). The Begin Again Tour was the duo's first concert tour since finishing their military service in South Korea.

In January 2018, Tohoshinki announced three shows at Nissan Stadium, as a grand finale of the tour, thus becoming the only foreign artists to perform at the venue twice, as well as the first artists to hold concerts at Nissan Stadium across three consecutive days. They are reported to gain a revenue of 56.1 billion won (50.4 million USD) for only 3 days concert in Nissan Stadium. More revenue were made from the concert goods than the tickets (with 29 billion won and 27.1 billion won separately).

Tomorrow: Live Tour 2018 
Tomorrow: Live Tour 2018 (stylized as Tohoshinki Live Tour 2018 ～Tomorrow～), also known as the Tomorrow Tour, was the tenth Japanese concert tour by South Korean pop duo Tohoshinki. The tour is supported by their album Tomorrow, which was released on September 19, 2018.

On June 10, 2018, during the last concert in Nissan Stadium of Begin Again Tour, in front of 75,000 audience, Tohoshinki announced the new arena and dome tour. They are estimated to bring 640,000 fans from their 10th Japan tour with total 32 concerts. It is the band's most expansive tour since their debut. On September 27, 2018, they announce to add 1 more show in Kyocera Osaka Dome on January 20, 2019, make the tour to 33 concerts with a 680,000 audience.

XV: Live Tour 2019–20 
XV: Live Tour 2019 (stylized as Tohoshinki Live Tour 2019 ～XV～), also known as the XV Tour, was the eleventh Japanese concert tour by South Korean pop duo Tohoshinki. The tour is supported by their album XV, which was released on October 16, 2019. They are estimated to bring 600,000 fans from their 11th Japan tour with total 14 concerts. On January 19, 2020, they announce to add 2 more shows in Tokyo Dome on April 25–26, 2020, make the tour to 16 concerts with 700,000 audience.

Classyc: Live Tour 2023 
Classyc: Live Tour 2023 (stylized as Tohoshinki Live Tour 2023 ～Classyc～), also known as the Classyc Tour, is the twelfth Japanese concert tour by South Korean pop duo Tohoshinki.

Fan club events
Fan club events are organized by Bigeast—the official fanclub of TVXQ in Japan—and are only for Bigeast members.

See also
List of TVXQ concert tours

References

External links
Tohoshinki Live Tour 2015 ~With~ Official Website

TVXQ concert tours
TVXQ
Lists of concert tours of South Korean artists
South Korean music-related lists